Yvonne W. A. Hanson-Nortey (born 18 February 1964 in Croydon, Greater London) is a retired female shot putter from England. She was affiliated with Hallamshire Harriers.

Athletics career
Hanson-Nortey represented England, at the 1986 Commonwealth Games in Edinburgh, Scotland. Four years later she represented England and won a bronze medal in the shot put event, at the 1990 Commonwealth Games in Auckland, New Zealand.

Her personal best put was 17.45 metres, achieved in July 1989 in London (Crystal Palace). This places her sixth on the British outdoor all-time list, behind Judy Oakes, Myrtle Augee, Meg Ritchie, Venissa Head and Angela Littlewood.

International competitions

References
sports-reference

1964 births
Living people
People from Croydon
Sportspeople from London
British female shot putters
English female shot putters
Olympic athletes of Great Britain
Athletes (track and field) at the 1988 Summer Olympics
Commonwealth Games medallists in athletics
Commonwealth Games bronze medallists for England
Athletes (track and field) at the 1986 Commonwealth Games
Athletes (track and field) at the 1990 Commonwealth Games
Medallists at the 1990 Commonwealth Games